Moradabad (also Romanized as Morādābād; also known as Gardkūh) is a village in Bahadoran Rural District of the Central District of Mehriz County, Yazd province, Iran. At the 2006 National Census, its population was 1,107 in 325 households. The following census in 2011 counted 1,184 people in 402 households. The latest census in 2016 showed a population of 1,538 people in 469 households; it was the largest village in its rural district.

References 

Mehriz County

Populated places in Yazd Province

Populated places in Mehriz County